The flag of Nunatsiavut is the flag adopted by the Labrador Inuit Association to represent the Inuit of Labrador and their Land Claims Settlement Area called Nunatsiavut. The flag features the traditional Inuit inuksuk coloured white, blue, and green, echoing the flag of Labrador.

The flag became an official symbol of the region upon ratification of the Labrador Inuit Constitution on December 1, 2005. Schedule 1-C of the constitution defines the flag with a coloured sketch.

References 

Flags of Canada
Native American flags
Nunatsiavut
Nunatsiavut
Nunatsiavut